The Khone Falls and Pha Pheng Falls (Lbak Khaon) together form a waterfall located in Champasak Province on the Mekong River in southern Laos, near the border with Cambodia. It is the widest waterfall in the world at 10,783 metres (35,376 feet or 6.7 miles) in width from one edge of its multiple channels to the other.

The Khone Falls are the largest in southeast Asia, and are the main reason that the Mekong is not fully navigable into China. The falls are characterised by thousands of islands and countless waterways, giving the area its name Si Phan Don or 'the 4,000 islands'.

__NoTOC__

Navigable efforts
Because the Khone Falls stop the Mekong river from carrying boat traffic to and from China, French colonialists in the late 19th century made repeated attempts to navigate the falls. Their efforts failed, which led to the construction of the Don Det – Don Khon narrow gauge railway on Don Det and Don Khon islands.

Wildlife
Hemimyzon khonensis, a species of hillstream loach, is known from a single specimen collected in the Mekong at the Khone Falls. The falls are home to the plabuck, an endangered species of catfish said to be the largest freshwater fish in the world.

See also
List of waterfalls by flow rate

References

External links
 Mekong Express Laos Photo Album: Khone Falls
 Visit Laos: Champassak Province

Waterfalls of Laos
Mekong River
Geography of Champasak province